Freddie Rodriguez (born September 8, 1965) is an American politician currently serving in the California State Assembly. He is a Democrat representing the 52nd Assembly District, which encompasses portions of the Pomona Valley.

Rodriguez was first elected to the Assembly in a 2013 special election to replace then-Assemblymember Norma Torres, who was elected to the California State Senate in a special election.

Rodriguez is a member of the California Latino Legislative Caucus. Prior to being elected to the Assembly, he was a Pomona City Councilmember and an emergency medical technician.

Political career 
In 2006, Rodriguez served twice on the Pomona City Council before being elected to the California State Assembly.

In 2017, Rodriguez was appointed as Chair of the Assembly Committee on Public Employees, Retirement, and Social Security by Speaker Anthony Rendon.

2014 California State Assembly

2016 California State Assembly

2018 California State Assembly

2020 California State Assembly

References

External links 
 
 Campaign website
 Join California Freddie Rodriguez

Democratic Party members of the California State Assembly
Hispanic and Latino American state legislators in California
Living people
21st-century American politicians
People from Pomona, California
Year of birth missing (living people)
California city council members